{{DISPLAYTITLE:H2O (H2O album)}}

H2O is the first album released by American hardcore punk band H2O. It was released on June 25, 1996. The CD was recorded and mixed in three days. H2O did a video for "Family Tree" in the fall of 1996.

Track listing 
 "5 Yr. Plan" – 2:57
 "Scene Report" – 2:18
 "Spirit of '84" – 2:04
 "I Know Why" – 2:50
 "Gen-Eric" – 0:59
 "Surrounded" – 2:01
 "Here Today, Gone Tomorrow" – 2:38
 "Family Tree" – 2:56
 "Hi-Lo" – 2:04
 "My Curse" – 9:00 (3:05 on Japanese release)
 "Go!" – 2:41 (Japan only)
 "Mask" – 2:35 (Japan only)
 All songs written by H2O
 Track 10 is only actually 3:05 – studio feedback then leads directly into a live hidden track, "My Love Is Real".

Personnel 
 Toby Morse – vocals
 Todd Morse – guitar, vocals
 Rusty Pistachio – guitar, vocals
 Eric Rice – bass
 Todd Friend – drums, vocals
 Dicky Barrett of The Mighty Mighty Bosstones – vocals on "Family Tree"
 Tim Shaw of Ensign (credited as Tim Ensign) – vocals on "Here Today, Gone Tomorrow", bass on "My Love Is Real"
 Armand Majidi of Sick of It All – drums on "My Love Is Real"
 Pete Koller of Sick of It All – guitar on "My Love Is Real"

Recorded January 15–17, 1996, at Brielle Studios in New York City
Produced by Larry Buksbaum and H2O

References

External links 
 Blackout Records
 Epitaph Records

H2O (American band) albums
1996 debut albums